Paul Williams (born Paul Nigel Vincent Yarlett; 19 September 1940 – 1 March 2019) was an English blues and rock singer and musician.

Career
During his early career he joined Zoot Money's Big Roll Band on bass and vocals, alongside the guitarist Andy Summers. He then replaced John McVie in John Mayall & the Bluesbreakers, while also recording with Aynsley Dunbar and Dick Heckstall-Smith. In 1970 he joined the band Juicy Lucy as lead vocalist and recorded the album Lie Back and Enjoy It. This band included future Whitesnake guitarist Micky Moody and featured in the 1971 film Bread. Williams later collaborated with Moody on the album Smokestacks, Broomdusters and Hoochie Coochie Men in 2002.

In 1973 he joined the progressive rock group Tempest, led by Jon Hiseman on drums with Mark Clarke on bass and Allan Holdsworth on guitar. After relocating to the United States, he joined Holdsworth in the group known as I.O.U. and recorded the three critically acclaimed albums I.O.U., Road Games and Metal Fatigue.

His most recent touring band had been Blue Thunder, with release in collaboration with David Hentschel in 2018 of Blue Thunder 2.

Discography

As leader/co-leader
 Delta Blues Singer (1973)
 In Memory of Robert Johnson (1973)
 Blues and Beyond with Blue Thunder (1998)
 Smokestacks, Broomdusters and Hoochie Coochie Men (2002) with Micky Moody

With other artists
With Zoot Money
 The All Happening Zoot Money's Big Roll Band at Klooks Kleek (1966)

With John Mayall
 Looking Back (1969)
 Thru the Years (1971)
 London Blues (1964–1969) (1992)

With Aynsley Dunbar
 Blue Whale (1971)

With Juicy Lucy
 Lie Back and Enjoy It (1970)
 Get a Whiff of This (1971)
 Pieces (1972)

With Dick Heckstall-Smith
 A Story Ended (1972)
 Blues and Beyond (2001)

With Tempest
 Tempest (1973)
 Under the Blossom: The Anthology (2005)

With Allan Holdsworth
 I.O.U. (1982)
 Road Games (1983)
 Metal Fatigue (1985)
 I.O.U. Live (1997, unauthorised)
 Live in Japan 1984 (2018)

References

External links
 

1940 births
2019 deaths
British rhythm and blues boom musicians
20th-century British male musicians
21st-century British male musicians
Tempest (UK band) members
English rock singers